Olga Erteszek (June 15, 1916 – September 15, 1989) was a Polish-American undergarment designer and lingerie company owner. She was famous for her nightgowns with full, flowing skirt width and generous sweep.

Early life
Otylia Erteszek, known as Olga, and her husband Jan (1913–1986), a criminal lawyer who previously bore the name Jakob, came to the United States in 1941. Fleeing Poland and the invading Nazi army, the young couple left their family, emigrating to Russia and then Japan. They both eventually secured visas for the United States and moved to California.

Her company's history
As the daughter of a corsetiere, Olga worked in a sweatshop making girdles and bras. Meanwhile, Jan found work in sales. After spotting a woman on a trolley with hosiery rolled to her knees, Olga noted that many women didn't have at least some bit of finery to hold up their stockings. Jan encouraged her to create something herself to address the problem.

Olga sewed a dozen or so lace-trimmed garter belts that Jan sold to a buyer at an elite department store. Enduring from the 1940s to today, Olga was known as one of America’s leading makers of fashionable lingerie, sleepwear, and loungewear. Jan operated as head marketing and sales director. He insisted that Olga herself appear in the advertising under the tagline, “Behind every Olga there really is an Olga.”
 
Olga held the women's record for patents at 28.  In addition to winning many industry awards, Olga and her husband were honored for their community and humanitarian work. In 1985, they received the California Industrialist of the Year Award for lifetime achievement. Olga was one of the first businesses to initiate profit sharing for employees. In 1967, it became a publicly owned corporation valued at $67 million. In 1984, Olga was ranked as a Fortune 500 company and one of the best 100 companies to work for in America.

Ownership changes
In 1984, Olga was purchased by Warnaco for $28 million, which Olga and Jan felt was a good match as both companies had the same congruent philosophies. Shortly after this, a hostile takeover of the purchasing company changed the culture of the company drastically. In 1986, the same year that Olga and her daughter, and heir apparent, Christina, were honored with New York's The Underfashion Club's Femmy Award, her husband, Jan, died. In 1988, the Intimate Apparel Council honored her with their first Intime Award.

Notable items
One notable piece of lingerie Olga designed was the Built-In Bra Nightgown.

Personal life 
Olga Erteszek and her husband Jan Erteszek had a daughter, Christina Erteszek in 1949.

Death
Olga Erteszek died of breast cancer in September 1989 at her home in Brentwood, California.

Sources 
 Susan Ware & Stacy Braukman (eds) (2004). Notable American Women: a biographical dictionary completing the twentieth century. Belknap Press. 

Guide to Vintage Olga Lingerie - Company history and trademarks http://www.vintagepavement.com/guide-vintage-olga-nightgowns-lingerie/

References

1916 births
1989 deaths
 Lingerie brands
 American designers
 Polish emigrants to the United States
 Polish designers